First, You Cry is a 1978 American made-for-television biographical drama film starring Mary Tyler Moore, Anthony Perkins, Jennifer Warren, Richard Dysart and Don Johnson, directed by George Schaefer. It is based on the 1976 autobiography First, You Cry written by NBC News correspondent Betty Rollin in which she recalls her battle with breast cancer. The film was broadcast on CBS on November 8, 1978.

Synopsis
TV news correspondent Betty Rollin (Moore) is giving a television report on the dangers of breast cancer, hoping that it will make women more aware of preventative measures. At home, Betty's husband Arthur Heroz (Perkins), a successful author, comments on how a lump in Betty's left breast has grown appreciably harder since she had it examined some time ago. Betty promises to make a follow-up exam. The subsequent checkup, however, leads to a diagnosis of cancer. Following a period of fear and denial, Betty agrees to a biopsy, which, due to the cancer's spread, leads to an immediate mastectomy. Upon leaving the hospital, Betty tries to deal with her varied emotions, along with those of her self-involved spouse, former lover, mother and friends. When she can't perform simple tasks like putting on a robe, Betty falls into depression. She sees herself as "damaged goods", leading to dramatic intimacy issues with Arthur.

Betty returns to work, but feels only awkwardness with colleagues. Things worsen when Betty finally looks at her scar, and assumes that all men will now be repulsed by her body. When husband Arthur becomes increasingly distant, she reunites with former beau David (Crenna). She goes to live with him in Philadelphia, quitting her job and leaving her friends behind. After a period of bliss, however, Betty still finds herself unhappy. She then decides to write a book about her travails, leading to an overhaul of her life, both professionally and personally.

Cast
Mary Tyler Moore as Betty Rollin
Anthony Perkins as Arthur Heroz
Jennifer Warren as Erica Wells
Richard Dysart as Dr. Brennerman
Don Johnson as Daniel Easton
Florence Eldridge as Mrs. Rollin
Patricia Barry as Anne
Antoinette Bower as Marsha
Richard Crenna as David Towers
Vivi Janiss as Martha

Production
First, You Cry was shot from February 14 to March 16, 1978: exterior scenes were filmed on location in New York City and interior scenes were filmed at CBS Studio Center in Studio City, California.

Award nominations
Nominated: 1979 Golden Globe Award – Best Motion Picture Made for Television
Nominated: 1979 Primetime Emmy Award – Outstanding Drama or Comedy Special
Nominated: 1979 Primetime Emmy Award – Outstanding Film Editing for a Limited Series or a Special (James Galloway)
Nominated: 1979 Primetime Emmy Award – Outstanding Lead Actress in a Limited Series or a Special (Mary Tyler Moore)
Nominated: 1979 Primetime Emmy Award – Outstanding Music Composition for a Limited Series or a Special (Peter Matz)
Nominated: 1979 American Cinema Editors – Best Edited Television Special (James Galloway)
Nominated: 1979 Directors Guild of America Award – Outstanding Directorial Achievement in Specials/Movies for TV/Actuality (George Schaefer)

In popular culture
The film was parodied on the November 17, 1979 episode of Saturday Night Live hosted by Bea Arthur, in a sketch titled "First He Cries". In the sketch, a husband (played by Bill Murray) is distraught over his wife's (played by Gilda Radner) mastectomy. The sketch was controversial and received over 200 calls and 300 letters of complaint. Betty Rollin herself wrote a letter in support of the sketch.

Home Media 
MTM Home Video released the film First, You Cry in 1993 on VHS tape. As of this posting, the telefilm has not been reissued on DVD.

References

External links

1978 television films
1978 films
1970s biographical drama films
American biographical drama films
Films based on biographies
Drama films based on actual events
Films about cancer
Biographical films about journalists
CBS network films
Films directed by George Schaefer
Films shot in New York City
Films shot in Los Angeles
MTM Enterprises films
1978 drama films
1970s English-language films
American drama television films
1970s American films